is a Japanese manga artist. Okazaki often focuses on urban Japanese life in Tokyo from the 1980s and 1990s. Okazaki's characters are bold and freewheeling, holding unconventional sets of values. Her writings are often studded with modern jargon. Okazaki is one of the early forebears of the gyaru manga style.

Life and career
Kyoko Okazaki was born in 1963 in Tokyo. She lived in a family extended to fifteen people. Her father was a hairdresser and held a large drawing room. The whole family lived there together: grandparents, uncles and aunts, cousins, and even apprentice hairdressers. Okazaki often wondered what the family and the home can represent in these conditions. While living in a happy and peaceful environment, she has not been able to feel at ease in this large family.

In 1983, while studying at Atomi Junior College, Okazaki made her debut as a professional manga artist with the short story in Manga Burikko, an erotic hentai manga magazine primarily aimed for male adults. She published several more short stories in the magazine. In 1985, after graduating from college, she published her first manga series Virgin, and in 1989, she wrote Pink, which is about an office worker in her early 20s who works as a call girl at night in order to help support her pet crocodile. This work firmly established her reputation as a manga artist. Okazaki also worked on the series Tokyo Girls Bravo, which was published in CUTIE, a mainstream Japanese fashion magazine aimed at teens.

In 1992, she released Happy House, which is about a 13-year-old daughter of a television director and actress, who are often too busy to care for her children. When the teenager faces the possible divorce of her parents, she does not want to live with her father or mother, because she feels that she cannot be happy with either one of them. Instead, she dreams of leaving her home to live alone and earn her own money so she can emancipate herself from her parents.

In 1994, Okazaki put on a solo exhibition at the grand opening of the experimental art space, P-House, in Tokyo. From 1993 to 1994, she did a serialization called River's Edge and portrayed the conflicts and problems experienced by high-schoolers living in a suburb in Tokyo. This series had a big influence on the literary world.

Okazaki is a fashion illustrator, and her manga illustrates the cutting-edge fashion and customs of Japan during the 1980s and 1990s. Okazaki's manga describes the loneliness and emptiness that characterizes this time period.

From 1995 to 1996, she worked on Helter Skelter, which features a beautiful model, Ririko, whose body underwent a total cosmetic surgery, and illustrates the accelerating derailment of her success. Here, Okazaki exposes with much reality the obsession, jealousy, and deprivation caused by the desire to acquire “beauty” and the overpowering economic and commercial circumstances surrounding such desire. Helter Skelter was serialized in Shodensha's monthly Feel Young magazine at the time of writing and published as a single tankōbon volume in 2003. In 2013, American Kodansha imprint Vertical, Inc. published the manga in English under the title Helter Skelter: Fashion Unfriendly.

In May 1996, Okazaki was hit by a drunk driver and sustained severe injuries, and went on hiatus to rehabilitate.

Legacy 
More than 20 years after taking a break from writing, her past works were still being reprinted intermittently and had also been made into live-action movies.

Her early work for erotic and pulp manga magazines in the 1980s is considered pioneering in the way it dealt directly with the sexuality of young women outside of the norms of shōjo manga. Together with other female artists who worked for hentai magazines such as Erica Sakurazawa, Shungicu Uchida and Yōko Kondo, she is sometimes referred to as "onna no ko H mangaka" ("women H cartoonists").

Bibliography

See also
 La nouvelle manga

References

External links 

 List of all of Okazaki's work at the Media Arts Database (Japanese)

1963 births
Japanese female comics artists
Female comics writers
Japanese women writers
Living people
Women manga artists
Manga artists from Tokyo
People from Setagaya